Circo Massimo is a station on Line B of the Rome Metro. It was opened on 10 February 1955 and is sited at the east end of the Circus Maximus, after which it is named, near the headquarters of the FAO, originally built as the Ministero delle Colonie. Until 2002 the Obelisk of Axum also stood near the station. It has two separate exits on either side of the viale Aventino.

Surroundings
 Porta Capena
 Baths of Caracalla
 Passeggiata Archeologica
 Aventino
 Via dei Cerchi
 Roseto comunale
 rione San Saba
 Viale Aventino
 Stadio delle Terme

Churches
 Santa Balbina all'Aventino
 Santa Sabina
 Santi Alessio e Bonifacio
 Santa Prisca
 San Saba
 San Gregorio al Celio

References

External links 

Station on the site of ATAC.

Rome Metro Line B stations
Railway stations opened in 1955
1955 establishments in Italy
Rome R. XII Ripa
Rome R. XXI San Saba
Railway stations in Italy opened in the 20th century